The 2009 FIA GT Paul Ricard 2 Hours was the seventh  round of the 2009 FIA GT Championship season. It took place at Circuit Paul Ricard on 4 October 2009.  The race was won by the Corvette of Enrique Bernoldi and Roberto Streit for Sangari Team Brazil, ahead of the No. 2 Vitaphone Racing Team Maserati and Selleslagh Racing Team Corvette.  In the GT2 category, Toni Vilander and Gianmaria Bruni won from pole position in the AF Corse Ferrari, leading the Prospeed Competition Porsche and the second AF Corse Ferrari.

Vitaphone Racing Team and AF Corse both secured the FIA GT Teams Championships for the GT1 and GT2 categories in this race.

Report

Qualifying
Qualifying was led by the No. Sangari Corvette of Enrique Bernoldi, however the car had been given a five grid spot penalty prior to qualifying for causing an avoidable accident during pre-qualifying practice.  This moved the Sangari car back to sixth, and moved Alex Müller to pole position and allowing Vitaphone Racing Team to lock out the front row.  In the GT2 category Gianmaria Bruni of AF Corse secured an all Ferrari front row alongside CRS Racing.

Qualifying results
Pole position winners in each class are marked in bold.

Race

Race results
Class winners in bold.  Cars failing to complete 75% of winner's distance are marked as Not Classified (NC).

References

Paul Ricard
FIA GT Paul Ricard
FIA GT Paul Ricard 2 Hours